Hassan Rouhani, the incumbent President of Iran, launched his reelection campaign for the Presidential office in February 2017. The election itself and related events received international media attention with many issues being raised. Rouhani achieved a decisive victory after the May 2017 vote, with Interior Minister Abdolreza Rahmani Fazli announcing that out of 41.3 million total votes cast Rouhani got 23.6 million. Ebrahim Raisi, Rouhani's closest rival, had picked up 15.8 million votes in contrast.

Early stages 
The incumbent President Hassan Rouhani was considered a potential candidate in 2015. On 25 October 2016, Iranian interior minister Abdolreza Rahmani Fazli said that President Hassan Rouhani is “sure to run for a second term”. On 13 January 2017, Mahmoud Vaezi said Moderation and Development Party will back Rouhani in the election. Rouhani himself never announced bid for re-election.

Branding and record 
In the summer of 2013 Rouhani was up against serious problems in almost every key sector of the Iranian economy. The economic picture is incomparably better today than it was three years ago. Inflation has declined from 40 to 10%, and the rial’s exchange rate has stabilized at its level from the year President Rouhani was elected.
Rouhani has restored a sense of security by preventing hyperinflation and shortages. Peace with world major powers on the basis of Joint Comprehensive Plan of Action at the time he was done. Removing the nuclear sanctions was among Rouhani campaign promises in 2013 and according to his administration, all nuclear-related sanctions, except for certain restrictions in banking, have been lifted following the nuclear deal between Tehran and world powers.
The administration Rouhani also succeeded in increasing Iran’s revenues via boosting oil and gas outputs and growing gas condensate exports. Iran oil exports have doubled since the deal took effect and major problems in the way of securing insurance for cargoes carrying oil from Iran have been resolved. Iran there has been an uptick in Asian and European trade with Iran, mainly due to the expansion of Iranian oil exports, which now stand at 2.5 million bpd. Foreigners have shown interest in making investments in the country and sharing their technologic know-how in various industrial fields. Consequently, the Rouhani administration succeeded in signing various agreements to attract foreign investments for implementing infrastructure projects to revamp road, rail, and air transport systems.
He extension government campaign by name "Again Iran" and We cannot go back. Rouhani campaign symbol is "Election ink" along with "V sign".
Is conversation Rouhani government "Freedom, security, peace and progress".

Meeting 
Hassan Rouhani on the big meeting at Azadi Sport Complex said the Iranian nation will decide between the path of "calm or tension" in the next presidential election, which he called "decisive". Addressing a stadium packed with tens of thousands of supporters, Rouhani, who seeks another four-year term in office in the May 19 vote, said the nation on Election day should show the world that it is "determined for the future of Iran, not to sell it out. Rouhani said 12th government to promote justice, reforms Iran spared no efforts to transform the image of extremism and violence to image of hope and justice and reformist way.

Positions

Economics
Rouhani said "If we want a better economy, we should not let groups with security and political backing to get involved in the economy," Rouhani said during the debate, in an unmistakable swipe at the Islamic Revolutionary Guard Corps, an elite military force with a vast business empire, which has backed his main hardline opponent Ebrahim Raisi. Rouhani said at telecast “Some believe that unemployment can be tackled simply by distributing money or claiming to create plenty of jobs, while what is actually required to raise employment is making people look hopefully at future and feel calm and safe”.

Foreign policy
Rouhani said at Isfahan and Mazandaran "Dear people of Iran, vote for freedom. I am ready to get the remaining sanctions lifted if elected. Rouhani said, Lifting the remaining sanctions would be difficult, as Khamenei, who has the last say on all state matters, has flatly rejected normalization of ties with the United States.

Social rights
Rouhani said in Shiroudi hall meeting, “We won’t accept gender discrimination, we won’t accept gender oppression we want social and political freedom,” he said amid occasional eruptions of chants in support of opposition leaders under house arrest, Mir Hossein Mousavi and Mehdi Karroubi and Mohammad Khatami dear for people. Rouhani is considered a moderate pro-dialogue President. He encourages personal freedom and free access to information. Rouhani advocates the free functioning of social networks.
Rouhani to say Ebrahim Raisi, "I am surprised. Those of you who talk about freedom of speech these days".

Young generation
Rouhani against rivals said “We are here to tell pro-violence extremists that your era has come to an end”, “You hardliners cannot stand against our youth’s choice of freedom and progress.”

Provincial visits

Media coverage 
Rouhani's campaign publishes a newspaper named National Aspiration.
His TV documentary was censored by IRIB.

Endorsements

Political umbrella organizations 
 Reformists' Supreme Council for Policymaking
 Council for Coordinating the Reforms Front
 Reformists Front
 Front of Prudence and Development

Parties 
 Moderation and Development Party
 Union of Islamic Iran People Party
 Democracy Party
 Will of the Iranian Nation Party
 Islamic Labour Party
 NEDA Party
Association of Combatant Clerics
Assembly of Qom Seminary Scholars and Researchers
National Trust Party
Illegal parties
 Freedom Movement of Iran
 Kurdish United Front
 Iranian Call and Reform Organization
 Green Path of Hope
National Front
Council of Nationalist-Religious Activists of Iran

Trade unions/Profession-designated parties 
 Workers' House
 Supreme Association of Retired Workers and Social Security Pensioners
 Islamic Association of University Instructors

Individuals 
Politicians
 Eshaq Jahangiri, first vice president 
 Mohammad Khatami, former president
 Mir-Hossein Mousavi, former prime minister
 Zahra Rahnavard, one of Green Movement leaders
 Ali Akbar Nategh-Nouri, former speaker of the parliament
 Mehdi Karoubi, former speaker of the parliament
 Mostafa Hashemitaba, 2017 presidential candidate
 Mohammad Reza Aref, MP
 Ali Larijani, parliament speaker
 Abdollah Nouri, former interior minister
 Mohammad Hashemi Rafsanjani, former IRIB head
 Mohammad Beheshti Shirazi, former head of Cultural Heritage organization 
 Mostafa Moeen, former science minister
 Ali Younesi, former intelligence minister
 Ebrahim Yazdi, former foreign minister
 Parviz Kazemi, former welfare minister
 Soheila Jolodarzadeh, MP
 Masoud Pezeshkian, MP
 Ali Motahari, MP
 Behrouz Nemati, MP
 Parvaneh Mafi, MP
 Mahmoud Sadeghi, MP
 Behrouz Nemati, MP
 Mohammad Reza Khatami, former MP
 Fatemeh Rakeei, former MP
 Mohsen Rahami, former MP
 Hadi Khamenei, former MP
 Azam Taleghani, former MP
 Rasoul Montajabnia, former MP
 Shahrbanoo Amani, former MP
 Faezeh Hashemi, former MP
 Ali Shakouri-Rad, former MP
 Hossein Marashi, former presidential chief of staff
 Gholamhossein Karbaschi, former mayor of Tehran
 Sadegh Kharazi, former ambassador
 Jalal Jalalizadeh, former MP
 Abbas Amir-Entezam, former deputy prime minister
 Abdollah Ramezanzadeh, former government spokesperson
 Effat Marashi, former first lady
 Ahmad Hakimipour, Tehran City Councilor
 Saeed Hajjarian, former Tehran City Councilor
 Mohsen Hashemi Rafsanjani
 Fatemeh Hashemi Rafsanjani
 Hassan Khomeini
 Zahra Eshraghi
 Majid Takht-Ravanchi
 Hamidreza Jalaeipour
 Mehdi Khazali

Philosophers
 Mostafa Malekian
 Mohammad Mojtahed Shabestari
 Abdolkarim Soroush
Clerics
 Molavi Abdul Hamid
 Yousef Sanei
 Ali Mohammad Dastgheib Shirazi
Academics and scholars
 Sadegh Zibakalam
 Abbas Abdi
 Saeed Laylaz
 Emadeddin Baghi
 Mashallah Shamsolvaezin
 Firouz Naderi 
Artists, writers and musicians

 Asghar Farhadi
 Taraneh Alidoosti
 Shahab Hosseini
 Reza Attaran
 Kiumars Poorahmad
 Maziar Miri
 Reza Kianian
 Fatemeh Motamed-Arya
 Jamshid Mashayekhi
 Ali Nassirian
 Dariush Arjmand
 Baran Kosari
 Pouran Derakhshandeh
 Farhad Aslani
 Golab Adineh
 Christophe Rezai
 Kianoush Ayari
 Bahareh Rahnama
 Rakhshan Bani Etemad

 Mahtab Keramati
 Abdolhossein Mokhtabad
 Pegah Ahangarani
 Hasan Pourshirazi
 Abdolreza Kahani
 Kamal Tabrizi
 Leili Rashidi
 Reza Naji
 Amir Jafari
 Shabnam Moghaddami
 Houshang Moradi Kermani
 Abdollah Eskandari
 Maziar Miri
 Fereshteh Sadre Orafaee
 Reza Yazdani
 Tannaz Tabatabaei
 Parinaz Izadyar
 Fariborz Arabnia
 Mohammad-Ali Keshavarz

 Mahmoud Dowlatabadi
 Hossein Yari
 Reza Sadeghi
 Sahar Dolatshahi
 Mehdi Fakhimzadeh
 Mohsen Tanabandeh
 Ahmad Mehranfar
 Masoud Jafari Jozani
 Hamid Goudarzi
 Farhad Aslani
 Mehrab Ghasem Khani
 Maryam Amir Jalali
 Niusha Zeighami
 Setareh Eskandari
 Bahareh Kian Afshar
 Ebi
 Mohsen Chavoshi
 Shahrdad Rouhani
 Hafez Nazeri

Athletes 

 Ali Karimi
 Ali Daei
 Behdad Salimi
 Omid Norouzi
 Adel Gholami
 Sardar Azmoun
 Karim Bagheri
 Shahram Mahmoudi
 Arvin Moazzami
 Mitra Hejazipour
 Sarasadat Khademalsharieh
 Mehdi Taremi
 Masoud Mostafa-Jokar
 Zahra Nemati
 Alireza Haghighi
 Mojtaba Abedini
 Javad Nekounam

 Mehdi Rahmati
 Mojtaba Moharrami
 Arash Borhani
 Ali Parvin
 Farshad Ahmadzadeh
 Behnam Mahmoudi
 Behnam Barzay
 Hossein Hosseini
 Milad Zakipour
 Roozbeh Cheshmi
 Hamed Lak
 Sajjad Anoushiravani
 Alireza Mansourian
 Farhad Majidi
 Jalal Hosseini
 Ali Akbar Ostad Asadi
 Rahman Rezaei

 Amir Ghalenoei
 Alireza Beiranvand
 Navab Nassirshalal
 Mohammad Panjali
 Ali Ghorbani
 Kaveh Rezaei
 Hossein Shams
 Fereshteh Karimi
 Nima Alamian
 Noshad Alamian
 Mohammad Khalvandi
 Mohammad Sattarpour
 Arash Miresmaeli
 Kimia Alizadeh
 Hanif Omranzadeh
 Sosha Makani
 Rouzbeh Arghavan

See also 
 Hassan Rouhani presidential campaign, 2013

References 

2017 Iranian presidential election
Presidency of Hassan Rouhani
Election campaigns in Iran